Admiral Sir Richard Hughes, 2nd Baronet ( – 5 January 1812) was a British naval commander.

Naval career
Hughes was probably born in London, England, the son of Captain Sir Richard Hughes. He entered the Portsmouth Naval Academy in 1739. He served on a number of ships in various locations during his naval career, including  from 1763 to 1766. It is known that Hughes was in Canada in 1778, as he was appointed resident commissioner of the Halifax dockyard. This appointment was short, as by August of the same year he became lieutenant governor of Nova Scotia, succeeding Mariot Arbuthnot in that position. During his tenure, the main concern was the protection of the Province. In 1779, he succeeded his father as baronet. He became acting commander-in-chief The Downs in 1781.

In 1782 Hughes was second-in-command under Lord Howe at the Relief of Gibraltar. Between 1783 and 1786 he was appointed Commander-in-Chief, Leeward Islands Station. Then in 1789 he became Commander-in-Chief, North American Station.

Legacy 
 Fort Hughes (Nova Scotia) (est. 1778)
 Fort Hughes (New Brunswick) (est. 1781)

Arms

References

Kidd, Charles, Williamson, David (editors). Debrett's Peerage and Baronetage (1990 edition). New York: St Martin's Press, 1990.

External links

|-

|-

|-

|-

1729 births
1812 deaths
People from East Bergholt
Baronets in the Baronetage of Great Britain
Governors of the Colony of Nova Scotia
Royal Navy admirals
Royal Navy personnel of the American Revolutionary War